Lee Ulrich Eyerly (February 22, 1892 – March 23, 1963) was an American civil aviation pioneer and amusement ride manufacturer.

Early life
Eyerly was born February 22, 1892, in Cuba, Illinois, and raised in Canton. In 1909, his family moved to the Judith Basin area of Montana to take advantage of the Homestead Act. Because he was mechanically handy, he found work repairing broken farm equipment. While in his early 20s, he built his first airplane in the lobby of the hotel his mother managed, but was unable to fly it because he had no suitable engine. Around this same time, he married his wife Meta.

By 1919, Montana suffered from wind erosion and drought, and the opportunities for repairing farm equipment dwindled. Eyerly moved his young family to Salem, Oregon, where he became a heavy-equipment operator, working on the state’s burgeoning system of roads. As automobiles became more popular, he opened a service station called "The Grease Spot." In 1920, he took three hours of flying instruction from Elmer Cook – the only formal flying instruction he ever received. In 1921, he enrolled in the engineering program at the Oregon Agriculture College, where he was hired as an instructor shortly after. From 1923 to 1926, Eyerly and his family lived in Waldport, Oregon, where he worked as a ferry operator and opened another service station. In 1926, they moved back to Salem, and he purchased his first aircraft, a small mail plane.

Professional life
With funds raised by the American Legion, Lee purchased a five-acre (20,000 m²) plot of land near the former Governor’s Mansion on which he established Salem’s airport. By 1929, he founded an aviation school, and later, the first aircraft service station on the west coast. When the Great Depression hit, he devised two inexpensive ways to train pilots and founded the Eyerly Aircraft Company to manufacture them. The first was the Whiffle Hen, a plane which only burned two US gallons (8 L) of fuel per hour of flight. The second was a ground-based flight training device patented under the name "Orientator". The Orientator consisted of a small airplane suspended in what looked like the tines of a giant tuning fork. Air from the electrically driven propeller passed over the wings and rudder, and the operator controlled the movements of the plane in a manner similar to a real aircraft.

The Orientator was produced commercially and five were purchased by the Cuban government. When the Orientator was most popular to visitors at state fairs and carnivals, and Eyerly realized the Orientator was more profitable as an amusement park ride. It was renamed the Acroplane and 54 were subsequently produced. Eyerly changed his company's focus from aircraft to amusement rides.

Eyerly developed and patented numerous amusement rides which would become staples of carnival midways, including The Loop-O-Plane (1933), the Roll-O-Plane, the Fly-O-Plane and the Rock-O-Plane (1948). His most popular design was the Octopus, of which almost 400 were sold, and resulted in later variations: the Spider and the Monster. Two of his kiddie carousel rides were the Midge-O-Racer and Bulgy the Whale.

Although Eyerly’s manufacturing business became amusement rides, the name of his company remained Eyerly Aircraft and he maintained his interest in aeronautics. He served on the Oregon Aeronautics Board from the 1920s to 1958, including ten years as its chair. In 2001, Eyerly was named the third inductee into the Oregon Aviation Hall of Fame.

Death
Eyerly died of cancer on March 23, 1963, in Salem, Oregon.

References

External links 
 Lee Eyerly biography from salemhistory.net (Salem Public Library)

1892 births
1963 deaths
Amusement ride manufacturers
Deaths from cancer in Oregon
Oregon State University alumni
People from Canton, Illinois
People from Salem, Oregon
People from Cuba, Illinois